Cucueţi may refer to several villages in Romania:

 Cucueţi, a village in Verguleasa Commune, Olt County
 Cucueţi, a village in Scrioaștea Commune, Teleorman County

See also
 Cucuieţi (disambiguation)
 Cuca (disambiguation)